At least two warships of Japan have borne the name Akashi:

 , a  launched in 1897 and expended as a target in 1930.
 , a repair ship launched in 1938 and sunk in 1944.
 , an oceanographic research ship launched in 1971 and decommissioned in 1996.

Japanese Navy ship names
Imperial Japanese Navy ship names